In the United States, a haystack is a dish composed of a starchy food (Fritos, tortilla chips, or rice), topped by a protein (beans, grated cheddar cheese, taco-seasoned meat or meat alternative), in combination with fresh vegetables (shredded lettuce, tomatoes, olives, peppers), and garnished with various condiments (guacamole, sour cream, Ranch, and/or salsa). Haystacks are conceptually like a deconstructed tostada. The haystacks ingredients are served individually and assembled on the plate by the person who will be eating it.

History
Haystacks are composed of relatively small amounts of many ingredients, in flexible combinations, so they are well suited to serving large numbers of people at a low cost. The flexibility and crowd-pleasing nature of haystacks have made them a popular family and small-group choice for at least 60 years. Currently, haystacks are commonly used among three distinct North American religious subcultures.

Composition

Adventist haystacks
Seventh-day Adventist haystacks begin with a corn chip base, often Fritos, though larger, restaurant style chips are often used as well, which are typically crushed with the heel of the hand, followed by beans, and grated cheddar cheese. In Australian Adventist haystacks, corn chips are not crushed, as Australian Adventists see the crushing of corn chips as an abomination.  Lettuce, vegetables, and condiments, especially salsa, are typically added last. Many Adventists are vegetarians, and most official or semi-official Adventist cultural dining events are vegetarian, which is one reason haystacks are so popular with this group. Often a soy-based ground hamburger meat alternative is used as an additional haystack ingredient.  Haystacks are a common and iconic feature of after-service meals or potlucks, served either at church or in member's homes.

A Seventh-day Adventist named Ella May Hartlein is credited with coming up with the recipe for this version of haystacks in the early 1950s, when she and her family craved tostadas and could not find a Mexican restaurant close to their home.

Amish haystacks
The Amish haystack has less of a Mexican influence, and is less often vegetarian. The Amish haystack is built on a lettuce base, with crushed chips or crackers sprinkled on top, followed by cooked hamburger in tomato, spaghetti-like sauce. The haystack is finished with chopped vegetables, cheese, and any desired condiments. Amish haystacks tend to be associated with community fundraisers for families in need, as opposed to the Adventist haystacks, which are more associated with after-service shared community meals or "potlucks, commonly served at Thanksgiving."

Mormon haystacks
In the community associated with the Church Of Jesus Christ Of Latter Day Saints, these are better known as Hawaiian haystacks, so named for their frequent use of pineapple chunks as a topping. In contrast to the Mexican notes characteristic of the Adventist haystack, Mormon or Hawaiian haystacks are characterized by Asian notes, perhaps a function of the long-time presence of the Church of Jesus Christ of Latter-day Saints in Hawaii. Hawaiian haystacks use a white rice base, covered by small pieces of chicken in a sauce or gravy. They are topped by a variety of items, often including the eponymous pineapple chunks, cheddar cheese, celery, tomatoes, sliced almonds, coconut, and chow mein noodles for crunch.

Hawaiian haystacks are particularly popular in Utah and other western states where there is a high percentage of members of the church. Commonly served at church potlucks, Hawaiian haystacks are part of what is sometimes referred to as "Mormon Cooking", which also includes such dishes as pretzel jello salad, funeral potatoes and frogeye salad.

See also
Frito pie
Taco salad

References

External links

 Amish haystacks - at www.foodnetwork.co.uk

American cuisine
Food combinations